The history of Lindy Hop begins in the African American communities of Harlem, New York during the late 1920s in conjunction with swing jazz. Lindy Hop is closely related to earlier African American vernacular dances but quickly gained its own fame through dancers in films, performances, competitions, and professional dance troupes. It became especially popular in the 1930s with the upsurge of aerials. The popularity of Lindy Hop declined after World War II, and it converted to other forms of dancing, but it never disappeared during the decades between the 1940s and the 1980s until European and American dancers revived it starting from the beginning of the 1980s.

Early influences (1900s–1920s)

Lindy Hop combined a number of dances popular in the United States in the 1920s and earlier, many of which developed in African American communities. Just as jazz music emerged as a dominant art form that could absorb and integrate other forms of music, Lindy Hop could absorb and integrate other forms of dance. This hybridity is characteristic of vernacular dances, in which forms and steps are adapted and developed to suit the social and cultural needs of its participants in everyday spaces. Therefore, Lindy Hop was not originally the creative or economic project of formal dance academies or institutions.

Lindy Hop's genealogy can be seen in the ideological themes, social uses, and steps that it has absorbed during its development. For many Lindy Hop historians, the Charleston is Lindy Hop's most influential predecessor, and Lindy Hop's basic footwork and timing reflects that of the Charleston. The transition from Charleston to Lindy Hop was facilitated by the Breakaway, a partner dance which introduced the 'Swing out' and 'open position' of dances such as the Texas Tommy to the 'closed position' and footwork of partnered Charleston. As jazz music in the late 1920s changed, so did jazz dances, including the Lindy Hop. The swung note of swinging jazz encouraged dancers to introduce a 'delay' in their timing which influenced the execution of footwork and approaches to tempo within Charleston and Breakaway.

Classic era (1927 to 1935)

Harlem and Its Renaissance
The New York Renaissance of the 1920s raised the profile of African American vernacular culture in white communities within the United States, particularly in New York City. The popularity of African American dance and music fed what became a fascination with the somewhat illicit nature of the ghetto area. White patronage in the area brought much-needed income to the bars, clubs, and theaters of Harlem, as well as work for black artists in a city increasingly belabored by economic depression.

Upper and middle class white audiences were exposed to Harlem's working class entertainment, at first through white audiences attending black venues and shows in Harlem, but later through traveling shows, popular music, and cinema.  This prompted a mainstream thirst for "black" cultural forms. However, by the time dances such as the Lindy Hop reached mainstream white audiences, they had often been reworked by white teachers and film studios to accord with the aesthetics and social values of white mainstream America. White dancers in Hollywood films played pivotal roles in popularizing Lindy Hop. Dean Collins' dancing in particular not only spread the form across the United States but also provided less 'risque' versions for more conservative American palates.

Harlem's increasing popularity as an entertainment district, as well as a vibrant creative center for African Americans in the 1920s and 1930s, brought about the creation and popularization of Lindy Hop, both in social dance spaces and on the stage.

Origin of the Lindy Hop
In one account it is argued that, in the slang of the late 19th and early 20th centuries, a 'Lindy' was a young woman. There exists an unsubstantiated claim that the word "hop" was documented as early as 1913 as a term for swing dancing and was also, apparently, a term used by early Texas Tommy dancers to describe the basic move for their dance.

In a more influential, but inaccurate account, however, popular legend has it that dancer "Shorty" George Snowden renamed the breakaway dance as the Lindy Hop in a dance contest. In this version, Snowden was one of the 24 couples that competed in a negro dance marathon that began on June 17, 1928 at the Manhattan Casino, a ballroom that was located at 8th Avenue and 155th Street in Harlem.

During the contest "as he remembers it - Snowden decided to do a breakaway, that is, fling his partner out and improvise a few solo steps of his own. In the midst of the monotony of the marathon, the effect was electric, and even the musicians came to life...Fox Movietone News arrived to cover the marathon and decided to take a close-up of Shorty's feet" and an interviewer then asked him, "What are you doing with your feet?" Snowden, "without stopping, replied 'The Lindy'".

Research has shown that Snowden's account of the naming of the Lindy Hop in the Rockland Palace (the Manhattan Casino which was renamed at the time of the marathon) is likely not true because the term 'lindy hop' in connection with the Harlem Lindy Hop was used for the first time in public in September 1928, which is more than two months after Snowden and his partner Mattie Purnell supposedly named the dance in the dance marathon. The time gap between the dance marathon and the first use of the term in public does not make sense if Snowden really named the dance in the dance marathon.

As there does not exist proper evidence for the naming of the Lindy Hop, there exists evidence for inventing the Lindy Hop in the dance marathon in which Snowden and Purnell participated and devised the basic principle of the Lindy Hop.

Whether Snowden intended it or not, Lindy Hop was associated with Charles Lindbergh's transatlantic airplane flight, completed in 1927. "Lindy" was the aviator's nickname. The reporter interviewing Snowden apparently tied the name to Charles Lindbergh to gain publicity and further his story. While Lindbergh's trans-Atlantic flight may or may not have inspired the name "Lindy Hop", the association between the aviator, George Snowden and the dance continues in Lindy Hop folklore. Te Roy Williams and His Orchestra recorded the song "Lindbergh Hop," written by Ted Nixon and Elmer Snowden, on May 25, 1927. The Memphis Jug Band on 9/13/1928 recorded "Lindberg Hop (Overseas stomp)," written by Jab Jones and Will Shade.

Often referred to as the "first generation" of Lindy Hop, dancers such as George Snowden, Leroy "Stretch" Jones, Twistmouth George and Edith Matthews inspired many other dancers and troupes (including Frankie Manning) to take up Lindy Hop. Twistmouth George and Matthews are credited with inventing the "twist" that characterises the first few steps of the follower's footwork in the Swingout. By the end of the classic era Lindy Hop was danced across Harlem in ballrooms, night clubs, cabaret clubs, rent parties, apartments, and street parties — almost anywhere people came together with music to dance.

Aerials era (1935 to 1941)

In 1935 Lindy Hop—with swing music—had become increasingly popular throughout America, attributable in part to the success of musicians such as Artie Shaw, Benny Goodman, Count Basie, and Chick Webb.

Ballrooms across the United States hosted the big bands of the day, with Chick Webb leading one of the most popular at the Savoy Ballroom. It was with his orchestra that the teenage Ella Fitzgerald first gained fame. These ballrooms continued a national tradition of sponsoring contests where dancers invented, tested and displayed new steps for prizes. At first banning lindy hoppers because they took more space than other dancers and often kicked nearby couples, the Savoy eventually relented and welcomed them as an attraction for other guests. As the 'Home of Happy Feet', the Savoy became the hottest ballroom in New York City, if not the world.

The first air steps
Head bouncer at the Savoy Herbert "Whitey" White (an African American man nicknamed for a white streak in his hair) managed a team of local dancers that included George Snowden. White arranged for dancers to perform at professional engagements, including parties and shows, all over the city and country. George Snowden's absence from the ballroom with these performances gave a new generation of dancers the opportunity to shine, Frankie Manning among them. With the most popular dancers returning to the Savoy between engagements, rivalries soon developed between different groups, particularly between Shorty George and his friends and newer dancers such as Manning. These rivalries were often played out in formal competitions between groups.

Since the beginning of jazz dance, acrobatics were an essential part of vernacular dance, commonly known as flash dancers who toured with bands across United States during the first part of the 20th century. The first generation of Savoy Lindy Hoppers, George Snowden's generation, introduced the early versions of air steps and acrobatics to the Lindy Hop by the very beginning of the 1930s.

Savoy Lindy Hopper Frankie Manning has claimed that he devised the first air step in the Lindy Hop. This story, however, is inaccurate. It is more accurate to say that his first air step in the Lindy Hop likely helped to develop the spectacular air step routines which Manning's generation of Savoy Lindy Hoppers, the second generation, perfected.

Manning went on to dance extensively with one of the most influential Lindy Hop troupes, the Whitey's Lindy Hoppers (also known as Whitey's Lindy Maniacs, Whyte's Hopping Maniacs, The Harlem Congaroos, The Hot Chocolates, and other names). The troupe was based at the Savoy and managed by White. They performed around the world from 1935 to 1942 at private parties and in stage shows and films; contributing to the spread of Lindy across America.

Dean Collins and Hollywood
Lindy Hop's movement into the American and international mainstream is largely attributed to four factors: Hollywood films, dance studios and instructors such as Arthur Murray, touring dance troupes, and ordinary people (e.g., American troops in WWII bringing Lindy Hop to new countries). One of key figures in Lindy Hop's move to Hollywood was Dean Collins.

Dean Collins learned Lindy Hop from his sisters in New Jersey and became a high-profile dancer of this style on the west coast of the United States, appearing in a number of Hollywood films that capitalized on the popularity of swing music and dancing. Frankie Manning and other African American dancers also appeared in key films of the era, such as Hellzapoppin' and A Day at the Races, however, their films were not as numerous.

World War II era (1941 to 1945)
During the war many top performers were called to military service, including many Lindy Hoppers and musicians. Frankie Manning and other members of the Whitey's Lindy Hoppers were drafted, prompting the disbanding of the group. Lindy hop became a wartime recreation, with white dancers developing as the most well-known and common faces in popular musical films. In 1943, Life magazine featured Lindy Hop on its cover and called it "America's National Folk Dance".

In 1944, due to continued involvement in World War II, the United States levied a 30 percent federal excise tax against "dancing" nightclubs. Although the tax was later reduced to 20 percent, "No Dancing Allowed" signs went up all over the country.

Post-war era (1945 to 1984)
After the Second World War, music changed. Jazz clubs, burdened by new taxes and legislation limiting venues' ability to employ musicians and dancers or host dancing, employed only smaller bands and filled dance floors with tables. Musicians, immersed in the new world of bebop and cool jazz wanted patrons to pay attention and listen, not dance. The rise of rock and roll and bebop in the 1950s saw a further decline in the popularity of jazz for dancing, and Lindy Hop slipped from the public eye, replaced by Rock and Roll dancing, East Coast Swing, West Coast Swing and other dances.

Revival era (1980s)
Lindy Hop was revived in the 1980s by dancers in New York City, California, Stockholm, and the United Kingdom. Each group independently searched for original Lindy Hop dancers and, for those who lived outside of New York City, traveled to New York City to work with them. Al Minns, Pepsi Bethel, Frankie Manning and Norma Miller came out of retirement and toured the world teaching Lindy Hop, later to be joined by dancers such as George and Sugar Sullivan.

British revival
Louise "Mama Lou" Parks was a hostess at the Savoy Ballroom who promised Charles Buchanan that she would continue holding the Lindy Hop portion of the Harvest Moon Ball dance competition after the Savoy Ballroom closed. She helped preserve the dance by teaching the performance and competition aspects to a new generation of dancers, and in doing so, helped a generation from getting in trouble with the law. After Parks contacted Wolfgang Steuer of the World Rock 'N' Roll Federation in Germany about sponsoring the winners of her Harvest Moon Ball at their international swing dance competition, she started to become more well known in Europe and caught the attention of the British TV company London Weekend Television. "In 1981 they paid for one of Mama Lou's events to be re-staged at Small's Paradise Club on 7th Avenue in Harlem."

The program aired in late 1982 on the arts program The South Bank Show and featured Parks, her Traditional Jazz Dance Company, and the Lindy Hop. The TV show sparked so much interest in the dance that Mama Lou Parks and her Traditional Jazz Dance Company toured the UK in 1983 and 1984. Terry Monaghan and Warren Heyes met each other at her workshops in London in 1983. Afterwards, they decided to form the British dance company The Lindy Hop Jivers, later renamed to the Jiving Lindy Hoppers.

In March 1985, the Jiving Lindy Hoppers (Warren Heyes, Terry Monaghan, Ryan Francois, Claudia Gintersdorfer, and Lesley Owen) travelled to New York City on their first research visit. Their goal was primarily to meet Al Minns but when they arrived, they learned that he was in hospital and not expected to live much longer. (Al Minns died on 24 April 1985.) Through Mama Lou Parks, they met Alfred "Pepsi" Bethel and trained with him for two weeks in New York City followed by another week in London. While in NY, they also met two former members of Whitey's Lindy Hoppers, Frankie Manning and Norma Miller, dance historians Mura Dehn, Sally Sommer, and Ernie Smith, as well as dance enthusiasts that had just formed the New York Swing Dance Society in 1985. During the 1980s, the Jiving Lindy Hoppers were instrumental in spreading Lindy Hop throughout the UK by teaching and performing at shows, festivals and on TV. In January 1984, the Jiving Lindy Hoppers started teaching Lindy Hop in London. After the first few classes, Ryan Francois joined the classes and later that year became a member of the Jiving Lindy Hoppers. During the 1990s, he was considered one of the most talented modern Lindy Hoppers and travelled internationally to teach and perform the Lindy Hop with his dance company, Zoots and Spangles Authentic Jazz Dance Company (formed in 1986) formed with two other dancers who also left The Jiving Lindyhoppers troupe to form Zoots and Spangles. On 31 October 1987, Simon Erland, a sculptor and dance enthusiast, started Jitterbugs London with Ryan Francoise, the first European Lindy Hop and Swing club to run weekly events with classes that began the social Lindyhop revival. Ryan's troupe Zoots and Spangles were an integral part of the club and performed there regularly as well as in stage shows which grew the popular awareness of the dance. Jitterbugs and Zoots were the real catalyst for the Lindyhop revival in the 1980s and 1990s. Ryan Francois and Julie Oram taught Lindy Hop classes followed by DJed music from the 1930s, 1940s and 1950s. Sing Lim, "an extra enthusiastic and energetic dancer", became good friends with Ryan and Julie and in 1991, she started to help run Jitterbugs. Sing Lim taught the dance classes when Ryan and Julie were out of town performing for Zoots and Spangles, as well as helped advertise and promote the club. When Sing Lim returned to Singapore in 1994, she started Jitterbugs Swingapore and helped spread Lindy Hop to Singapore, Australia, and Japan, as well as parts of the U.S.

In 1986, Simon Selmon started taking Lindy Hop classes from Warren Heyes, his previous rock and roll dance instructor who had now converted to Lindy Hop. The dance classes inspired Simon Selmon to travel to New York City later that year, where he met Margaret Batiuchok, one of the founders of the New York Swing Dance Society. Upon his return to London, he started the London Swing Dance Society in a similar manner to the New York Swing Dance Society. Later, Simon Selmon travelled throughout Europe, America, and Japan teaching Lindy Hop.

Swedish revival

Three Swedish dancers who later formed an influential performance and teaching group called The Rhythm Hot Shots traveled to New York City in April 1984 in search of Al Minns, one of Whitey's Lindy Hoppers. They invited Al Minns to Stockholm, where he held a dance workshop in 1984 for the newly created Swedish Swing Society. When Al Minns died in 1985, they found Frankie Manning. The Swedish Swing Society and The Rhythm Hot Shots helped spread Lindy Hop throughout Sweden and the rest of the world, partly through the Herräng Dance Camp held every summer since 1982 in the town of Herräng.

American revival
In 1982, Al Minns was convinced to start teaching Lindy Hop at the Sandra Cameron Dance Center in New York City.

Californian dancers Erin Stevens and Steven Mitchell flew to New York City to take classes with him in 1983 and 1984. When Al Minns died in 1985, they learned about Frankie Manning through Bob Crease, a board member of the New York Swing Dance Society. They visited Frankie Manning in 1986 and are credited with convincing him to begin instructing Lindy Hop. Erin Stevens and Steven Mitchell helped spread Lindy Hop to California and other locations within the US. With Frankie Manning out of retirement, he continued where Al Minns left off at the Sandra Cameron Dance Center. Eventually the demand for his dance instruction increased and Frankie Manning started to travel and teach worldwide spreading his joy of Lindy Hop.

Neo-swing era (1990s)
The 1990s saw the rise of popular neo-swing bands such as Big Bad Voodoo Daddy, Royal Crown Revue, Dr. Zoot, Cherry Poppin' Daddies and Brian Setzer in the swing revival, and many other artists moving on from ska and punk rock based music to a reworking of swinging jazz musical themes and standard songs. Almost overnight, neo-swing bands and clubs popped up in most large cities in the United States, with the music's popularity growing internationally, with bands such as The Louisville Sluggers in Australia and many others. Neo-swing music was a modern interpretation of jazz and swing incorporating modern elements of rock, rockabilly, jump blues and ska rhythms played with blazing horns and over-the-top presentation.

Film such as Swing Kids (1993) and Swingers (1996) capitalized on the popularity of neo-swing, with the former discussing youth resistance to the Nazi party in Germany through jazz and Lindy Hop, and the latter becoming a cult-hit story of love and misadventure in Los Angeles. The popularity of films such as Swingers (which featured the Big Bad Voodoo Daddy and landmark Lindy Hop venue The Derby) prompted the American Gap commercial "Khaki Swing" in 1996 exploited the popularity of neo swing music with a sequence of swing dancing and the song "Jump Jive and Wail".

Many swing dancers who came to Lindy Hop in the 1990s cite these films, advertisements and bands as key factors inspiring them to take up lindy hop. Neo-swing dancers often dressed up with fancy zoot suits and many accessories. The dance - in order to be made simpler and easy to sell - was mainly taught as a six-count form based on East Coast Swing.

Revivalist Lindy Hoppers such as The Rhythm Hot Shots in Sweden and Sylvia Sykes in the United States were able to offer classes in Lindy Hop and other swing dances to interested young people in the late 1980s and 1990s.

As the fad died towards to end of the 1990s, the numbers of dancers dwindled and Lindy Hop was taught again as a jazz dance, and dancers had turned back to jazz music and continued to develop their dance. The neo-swing era, with all its problems, had one important contribution to Lindy Hop - popularizing the dance revivalists were researching and learning, and bringing it once again to the general public and creating a popular basis that has been a firm foundation for the continuation of the art form into the 21st century.

See also
Lindy Hop today
Lindy hop day 2019

Notes

The dance marathon at the Manhattan Casino was specifically for "Negro" dancers. George Snowden and his partner Mattie Purnell won "all the prizes for fancy stepping and other competitions" on June 20, 1928, during the third evening of competition. On June 27, The New York Times reported that Aurelia Ida Hallback and Bernard Paul, a couple in the dance marathon, had planned to marry on Friday, June 29. They were going to withdraw from the competition until the promoter, John Lavaro, said that a minister would be provided if they were still in the competition on their intended wedding date. The couple decided to marry while still dancing in the marathon and their wedding was recorded by FOX Movietone News in "MVTN C 4980: Couple Dance on Way to Get Marriage License". Four couples remained when the dance marathon was forced by the Health Commissioner to end after 16 days, on July 3. The eight finalists were awarded an equal portion of the $1000 prize at the Savoy Ballroom on Friday, July 6, 1928.

References

Further reading

 DeFrantz, Thomas. Dancing Many Drums: Excavations in African American Dance. Wisconsin: University of Wisconsin Press, 2001. .
 Emery, Lynne Fauley. Black Dance in the United States from 1619 to 1970. California: National Press Books, 1972. .
 Friedland, LeeEllen. "Social Commentary in African-American Movement Performance." Human Action Signs in Cultural Context: The Visible and the Invisible in Movement and Dance. Ed. Brenda Farnell. London: Scarecrow Press, 1995. 136 - 57.
 Gottschild, Brenda Dixon. Digging the Africanist Presence in American Performance. Connecticut and London: Greenwood Press, 1996. .
 Hazzard-Gordon, Katrina. Jookin': The Rise of Social Dance Formations in African-American Culture. Philadelphia: Temple University Press, 1990. .
 
 Jackson, Jonathan David. "Improvisation in African-American Vernacular Dancing." Dance Research Journal 33.2 (2001/2002): 40–53.
 Malone, Jacqui. Steppin' on the Blues: The Visible Rhythms of African American Dance. Urbana and Chicago: University of Illinois Press, 1996. .
 Szwed, John F., and Morton Marks. "The Afro-American Transformation of European Set Dances and Dance Suites." Dance Research Journal 20.1 (1988): 29 – 36.
 

Lindy Hop